Ricardo Sánchez Alarcón (born February 24, 1971 in Madrid) is a former water polo player from Spain, who was a member of the national team that won the silver medal at the 1992 Summer Olympics in Barcelona, Spain.

See also
 List of Olympic medalists in water polo (men)
 List of World Aquatics Championships medalists in water polo

References

External links
 

1971 births
Living people
Spanish male water polo players
Water polo players at the 1992 Summer Olympics
Olympic silver medalists for Spain in water polo
Sportspeople from Madrid
Medalists at the 1992 Summer Olympics
Water polo players from the Community of Madrid
20th-century Spanish people